The 1894 Ystradyfodwg Urban District Council election was held in December 1894 and was the first election to the district council of Ystradyfodwg in the Rhondda Valley, Glamorgan, Wales.  Three members were elected from each ward making a total of fifteen members on the authority. It was followed by the 1896 election.

Ystradyfodwg Urban District Council was renamed Rhondda Urban District Council in 1897.

Aggregate results

Ward No.1

Ward No.2

Ward No.3

Ward No.4

Ward No.5

References

1894
1894 Welsh local elections
December 1894 events